Kathleen Susan "Kate" Stokes (later Earwaker; 14 September 1916 – 2 February 2003) was an English athlete who competed in the 1938 British Empire Games.

At the 1938 Empire Games she was a member of the English relay team which won the silver medal in the 220-110-220-110 yards event and the bronze medal in the 110-220-110 yards competition. In the 100 yards contest as well as in the 220 yards event she was eliminated in the semi-finals.

References

External links
Profile at TOPS in athletics

1916 births
2003 deaths
Athletes (track and field) at the 1938 British Empire Games
Commonwealth Games bronze medallists for England
Commonwealth Games medallists in athletics
Commonwealth Games silver medallists for England
English female sprinters
Medallists at the 1938 British Empire Games